The combination drug acetylsalicylic acid/dipyridamole (trade names Aggrenox, Asasantin) is a drug combination of:
 Acetylsalicylic acid (Aspirin) - An extremely common NSAID that has anticoagulant effects
 Dipyridamole, a drug that inhibits platelet activation when given chronically and causes vasodilation when given at high doses over short time.

The combination acts as an extended release formulation and is primarily used for platelet inhibition in patients suffering, or at risk from, acute coronary events and stroke. Its use has been shown to be better than the use of either dipyridamole or aspirin alone.

References 

Boehringer Ingelheim
Combination drugs